Natalia Ramírez is a Colombian television actress.
She is  best known for her appearance as Marcela Valencia in Yo Soy Betty, la Fea (English language: I Am Betty, the Ugly), a comedy-drama telenovela first aired (1999–2001) on RCN TV in Colombia.

Career
In addition to her appearance on Yo Soy Betty, la Fea, Ramírez has since appeared in at least fifteen other television productions.

Filmography

Television

Reality TV

Awards and nominations

TVyNovelas Awards

References

External links

Colombian telenovela actresses
Colombian television actresses
Living people
Place of birth missing (living people)
1966 births